Uttarakhand has a total geographic area of  53,483 km2, of which 86% is mountainous and 65% is covered by forest. Most of the northern parts of the state are part of Greater Himalaya ranges, covered by the high Himalayan peaks and glaciers, while the lower foothills were densely forested till denuded by the British log merchants and later, after independence, by forest contractors. Recent efforts in reforestation, however, have been successful in restoring the situation to some extent. The unique Himalayan ecosystem plays host to many animals (including bharal, snow leopards, leopards and tigers), plants and rare herbs. Two of India's great rivers, the Ganges and the Yamuna take birth in the glaciers of Uttarakhand, and are fed by myriad lakes, glacial melts and streams.

Terrain and vegetation

Uttarakhand lies on the southern slope of the Himalaya range, and the climate and vegetation vary greatly with elevation, from glaciers at the highest elevations to tropical forests at the lower elevations. The highest elevations are covered by ice and bare rock. Western Himalayan alpine shrub and meadows occur between : tundra and alpine meadows cover the highest elevations, Rhododendron-dominated shrublands cover the lower elevations. Western Himalayan subalpine conifer forests lie just below the tree line; at  elevation they transition to western Himalayan broadleaf forests, which lie in a belt from  elevation. Below  elevation lie the Himalayan subtropical pine forests. The drier Terai-Duar savanna and grasslands belt and the Upper Gangetic Plains moist deciduous forests cover the lowlands along the Uttar Pradesh border. This belt is locally known as Bhabar. These lowland forests have mostly been cleared for agriculture, but a few pockets remain.

National parks

Indian National Parks in Uttarakhand include the Jim Corbett National Park previously named as Hailey National Park (the oldest national park of India) in Nainital District and Pauri Garhwal District, Valley of Flowers National Park and Nanda Devi National Park in Chamoli District, which together are a UNESCO World Heritage Site, Rajaji National Park in Haridwar District, Dehradun District and Pauri Garhwal District and Govind Pashu Vihar National Park and Gangotri National Park in Uttarkashi District.

See also
 List of mountain peaks of Uttarakhand
 Lakes of Kumaon hills
 Nanda Devi and Valley of Flowers National Parks
 Indomalayan realm
 Himalayan states
 Indian Himalayan Region
 Ecology of the Himalayas
 Geology of the Himalayas
 Geography of India
 Geology of India

References